Groupama Sailing Team is a French sailing team. Headed by skipper Franck Cammas, the team has won Volvo Ocean Race and Tour de France à la voile. They are also sailing in the 2017 America's Cup.

References

External links
Official homepage

Sailing teams
America's Cup teams
Extreme Sailing Series teams
Volvo Ocean Race teams